Lowzdar-e Sofla (also Romanized as Lowzdar-e Soflá and  Lūzdar-e Soflá; also known as Lourzdar-e Soflá, Lowzdar-e Pā’īn, and Lūzdar) is a village in Hendudur Rural District, Sarband District, Shazand County, Markazi Province, Iran. At the 2006 census, its population was 25, in 7 families.

References 

Populated places in Shazand County